The Timeless Land (1941) is a work of historical fiction by Eleanor Dark (1901–1985). The novel The Timeless Land is the first of The Timeless Land trilogy of novels about European settlement and exploration of Australia.

Story and characters 

The narrative is told from European and Aboriginal points of view. The novel begins with two Aboriginal men watching the arrival of the First Fleet at Sydney Harbour on 26 January 1788. The novel describes the first years of the colony and the diplomacy of captain Arthur Phillip, famine and the effects of outside diseases on the previously unexposed Aboriginal population. The novel ends in a dramatic climax when troops encounter an escaped convict. Dark conducted her historical research at the Mitchell Library in Sydney. Watkin Tench, author of The Complete Account of the Settlement at Port Jackson, is a key character in The Timeless Land. The book was reprinted in 2002 and the novel was on the curriculum for high school students in Australia in the mid-twentieth century.

The subsequent books in The Timeless Land trilogy are Storm of Time (1948) and No Barrier (1953).

Television production 

A television series was produced and broadcast by the Australian Broadcasting Commission, premiering on 4 September 1980. It was written by Peter Yeldham, based on the Eleanor Dark novels, and starred David Gulpilil as Bennelong and English actress Nicola Pagett (star of the British series Upstairs, Downstairs) as Mrs. Mannion. Other actors included Ray Barrett and John Frawley. The music was by Bruce Smeaton.

Production of the series had first been announced in 1976 but was postponed due to the large budget required. International rights to the series were sold to Paramount for $1 million. Shooting took place in Kellyville, an outer suburb of Sydney.

The 8 episodes of The Timeless Land commenced with a movie-length premiere:

 A ship with white wings
 Unsuitable company
 The fabric of liberty
 Double standards
 Smell of rebellion
 A declaration of war
 Prisoner at the bar
 A new order

In 2006 the Australian Broadcasting Commission released the television series on 3 DVDs, the episodes totalling 424 minutes.

Cast
Ray Barrett as Governor Bligh
Heather Christie as Anne King
Peter Collingwood as Governor Phillip
Athol Compton as Billalong
Ralph Cotterill as Finn
Peter Cousens as Patrick Mannion
John Cousins as Reverend Marsden
Michael Craig as Stephen Mannion
Max Cullen as Byrne
Patrick Dickson as Mark Harvey
Gary Duggan as Chaplain
John Faasen as George Crossley
John Frawley as Governor King
Adam Garnett  as Johnny - boy
Vincent Gil as Cunningham
David Gulpilil as Benelong
John Hamblin as Robert Campbell
Chris Haywood as Johnny
Brian Hinzlewood as Capt Johnston
Robert Hughes as Capt. Kemp
Vic Hunter as Abbott
Johnny Johnstone as Evans
Peter Kowitz as Gregory Blaxland
Don Mamouney as Doolan
Clive Marshall as Lynch
Bill McCluskey as Winden
Brett Nevill as Convict
Kirrily Nolan as Mary Putland
Kate Parker as Mrs. Blake
Geneviève Picot as Emily
Angela Punch McGregor as Ellen
Michael K. Ross as Governor's Aide
Robin Stewart as John Macarthur
Charlie Strachan as Driver
Noel Trevarthen as Collins
Anna Volska as Sarah
Nicola Pagett as Mrs. Mannion
Craig Walker as Gov. MacArthur's doorman

Notes and references

See also 

 Marcus Clarke: For the Term of His Natural Life (1870–1872)
 Robert Hughes: The Fatal Shore (1987)

References 

 The Timeless Land, Eleanor Dark. Introduction by Barbara Brooks and Humphrey McQueen. Pymble, NSW. HarperCollins Publishers Australia. 2002.

External links 
 The Timeless Land at the Open Library
 
 Varuna: The Writers House

1941 Australian novels
Novels by Eleanor Dark
Novels set in Sydney
Australian historical novels
Australian Broadcasting Corporation original programming
1980 Australian television series debuts
Australian drama television series
Television shows set in colonial Australia
1980s Australian television miniseries
English-language television shows
1980 Australian television series endings